The South Fork Clearwater River is a  long river in north-central Idaho in the United States.

The American River is sometimes considered part of the main stem. From the confluence the South Fork flows west through a canyon followed by Idaho State Highway 14, receiving the Crooked River from the left and Newsome Creek from the right before reaching Golden, where it receives Tenmile Creek from the left.

Grangeville (Harpster) Dam was built on the South Fork in 1910 for hydroelectricity generation. In 1963, the dam was demolished, restoring the river's populations of Chinook salmon and steelhead trout. Today, the entire South Fork and its headwater tributaries are free flowing and unobstructed by dams or major diversions.

References

Rivers of Idaho
Rivers of Idaho County, Idaho